Pedro Manuel Lobo Peixoto Mineiro Mendes (born 1 August 1999) is a Portuguese professional footballer who plays as a striker for Italian  club Ascoli.

Club career

Sporting CP
Born in Guimarães, Mendes started his youth career with local clubs Vitória S.C. and Moreirense F.C. before joining Sporting CP's academy at the age of 18. On 19 September 2019, after having scored seven goals in six games for the under-23 side to start the new season and before he had made his debut with the first team in the Primeira Liga due to registration problems, he appeared with the latter in a group stage match in the UEFA Europa League against PSV Eindhoven, and found the net immediately after having come as an 81st-minute substitute for fellow youth graduate Miguel Luís, albeit in a 3–2 away defeat; in the process, he became Sporting's first player to achieve the feat on his debut in European competition.

Mendes finally made his debut in the Portuguese top division on 11 January 2020, playing 14 minutes in the 3–1 away victory over Vitória de Setúbal. On 16 September, he joined Spanish Segunda División side UD Almería on a season-long loan. The following 1 February, however, he signed with C.D. Nacional also on loan. In his second appearance for the latter, as a second-half substitute against S.C. Farense, he scored twice (but one in his own net) in a 2–3 home loss.

On 16 July 2021, Mendes moved to Liga Portugal 2 club Rio Ave F.C. on a season-long loan deal, with an option to buy. He scored a squad-best ten goals, as the champions returned to the top flight after one year out.

Ascoli
On 29 August 2022, Mendes signed a three-year contract with Ascoli Calcio 1898 F.C. in the Italian Serie B.

International career
Mendes won his first cap for Portugal at under-21 level on 11 October 2019, in a 4–2 away loss against the Netherlands in the 2021 UEFA European Championship qualifiers where he replaced A.C. Milan's Rafael Leão.

Honours
Rio Ave
Liga Portugal 2: 2021–22

References

External links

1999 births
Living people
Sportspeople from Guimarães
Portuguese footballers
Association football forwards
Primeira Liga players
Liga Portugal 2 players
Sporting CP footballers
C.D. Nacional players
Rio Ave F.C. players
Segunda División players
UD Almería players
Serie B players
Ascoli Calcio 1898 F.C. players
Portugal youth international footballers
Portugal under-21 international footballers
Portuguese expatriate footballers
Expatriate footballers in Spain
Expatriate footballers in Italy
Portuguese expatriate sportspeople in Spain
Portuguese expatriate sportspeople in Italy